The flag of Bikini Atoll, a member of the Marshall Islands, closely resembles the flag of the United States and was adopted in 1987. The flag is symbolic of the islanders' position that a great debt is still owed by the U.S. government to the people of Bikini because in 1954 the United States detonated the Castle Bravo hydrogen bomb on the island, poisoning islanders and others with nuclear fallout.

Design 
The 23 white stars in the canton of the flag represent the 23 islands of Bikini Atoll. The three black stars in the upper right represent the three islands that were obliterated in March 1954 during the 15-megaton Bravo test by the United States. The two black stars in the lower right corner represent where the Bikinians live now, Kili Island,  to the south of Bikini Atoll, and Ejit Island of Majuro Atoll. These two stars are symbolically far away from Bikini's stars on the flag as the islands are in real life (both in distance and quality of life). 

The Marshallese language words on the flag,  (modern spelling ), (which translates as "Everything is in the hands of God") was the reply Bikinian leader Juda gave to U.S. Commodore Ben Wyatt in 1946 when the American asked the islanders to give up their islands for "the good of mankind and to end all world wars."

Symbolism 
The similarity to the American flag design and the striking isolation of the 3-star group and the 2-star group represent the position of the islanders that the Government of the United States still has obligations to their people, including reparations for the nuclear testing and resettlement of the Bikinians who were exiled.

References

External links
 Anthem, Story, Interviews and the Flag of Bikini Atoll

Flags of the Marshall Islands
Bikini Atoll
Bikini Atoll